Globe Derby Park may refer to:
 Globe Derby Park (harness racing), a trotting track in the northern part of Adelaide, South Australia
 Globe Derby Park, South Australia, the suburb of Adelaide around the trotting track and named after it